Kempele is a railway station in the municipality of Kempele, near Oulu, Finland. It was opened in 1886 together with the railway to Oulu. The station building, designed by a Finnish architect Knut Nylander was built in 1884 and later expanded in 1904. The track was electrified in 1983, but the station closed on May 27, 1990.

On September 26, 2013, the Finnish Transport Agency and the municipality of Kempele signed a contract to build a new platform and reopen the station. The platform was built in 2015 and services resumed in 2016.

References

Railway station
Railway stations in North Ostrobothnia
Railway stations opened in 1886
Railway stations closed in 1990
Railway stations opened in 2016